Alsie Express is a Danish virtual airline based at Sønderborg. All flights are operated by its sister carrier, Air Alsie, as it is not an AOC holder.

History
Alsie Express was founded in 2013 and it started operation on the route between Sønderborg and Copenhagen on 17 June 2013. The previous operator Danish Air Transport cancelled all fights between Sønderborg – Copenhagen a week after Alsie Express started flying the route.

In January 2021, Alsie Express announced the suspension of its scheduled services until late March 2021 in the wake of the COVID-19 pandemic.

Destinations

As of January 2021, Alsie Express serves the following destinations:

 Bornholm - Bornholm Airport seasonal 
 Copenhagen - Copenhagen Airport
 Dubrovnik Airport - seasonal charter
 Isle of Man - Isle of Man Airport seasonal charter
 Jersey - Jersey Airport seasonal charter
 Guernsey - Guernsey Airport seasonal charter
 Sälen and Trysil - Scandinavian Mountains Airport  seasonal 
 Sønderborg - Sønderborg Airport base
 Zadar Airport - seasonal charter

Fleet
As of January 2021, the Alsie Express fleet consists of the following aircraft:

See also
Green Airlines

References

External links

Alsie Express official website

Companies based in Sønderborg Municipality